In geometry, the pentagonal orthobirotunda is one of the Johnson solids. It can be constructed by joining two pentagonal rotundae along their decagonal faces, matching like faces.

Related polyhedra

The pentagonal orthobirotunda  is also related to an Archimedean solid, the icosidodecahedron, which can also be called a pentagonal gyrobirotunda, similarly created by two pentagonal rotunda but with a 36-degree rotation.

External links
 

Johnson solids